Lake Eufaula, sometimes referred to as Eufaula Lake, is a reservoir in Oklahoma. The lake covers parts of McIntosh County, Pittsburg, Haskell and Okmulgee counties and drains . Water sources include the Canadian, North Fork Canadian and Deep Fork rivers.

History
Congress approved construction of the dam and lake in 1946 to provide flood control, hydroelectric power, water supply, navigation and recreation. The U. S. Army Corps of Engineers began construction of the 975 meter-long (3,199 feet) Eufaula Dam wall in 1956 and was completed in 1964. President Lyndon B. Johnson came to Oklahoma to dedicate the dam on September 25, 1964. The hydroelectric power station was designed to provide 90,000 kilowatts of electric power from the lake waters.

According to the Corps of Engineers in 2015, the Eufaula project cost $121.4 million, and has prevented nearly $575.5 million in flood damages since its completion. The lake attracts about 2.5 million visitors every year.

This was the highest rate since 1990.

Dam construction

Eufaula Dam is east of the city of Eufaula, Oklahoma. It is constructed with an earthen embankment and concrete. The associated hydroelectric power plant has three turbines, each rated at 30 megawatts, for a total installed capacity of 90 megawatts The dam was approved by the Rivers and Harbors Act of 1946 and construction began in 1956. In February 1964, the river was closed and the generators went operational in September 1964. State Highway 71 runs across the top of the dam.

Recreational facilities
Activities at Lake Eufaula include boating, fishing, swimming, hiking, hunting, golfing and horseback riding. Picnic areas are scattered throughout the area. Facilities include marinas, boat ramps, swim beaches, tent and RV campsites, cabins, group shelters, restrooms, showers and an enclosed fishing dock.  These can be found at Lake Eufaula State Park and the physically-separate Arrowhead Area at Lake Eufaula State Park.

A well-known tournament lake, Lake Eufaula draws anglers from across the United States to test their skills at catching largemouth bass, smallmouth bass, Kentucky bass, crappie, catfish, sandbass, stripers (below the dam), and other species.

Former State Park Lodges
Oklahoma created two state parks, Arrowhead and Fountainhead, to provide recreational activities and camping facilities at the lake. The tag line in their early advertising was, "Follow the fun to Eufaula."  The state borrowed $8 million from the Federal government to build a lodge at each park. However, the lodges did not provide enough money to repay the loan, so ownership reverted to the Federal government. In 1986, the U.S. Economic Administration sold Arrowhead Lodge to the Choctaw Nation and Fountainhead Lodge to a group of private investors.  Arrowhead switched hands again in 2000, when a non-profit group with ties to the Church of Scientology bought the lodge and converted it into a drug and alcohol treatment facility, now called Narconon Arrowhead.  Fountainhead was sold out of a sheriff's sale to The Muscogee (Creek) Nation in 2005, amid plans to reopen it as a gaming facility.  Those plans never materialized, and the lodge was torn down.   However, a 48-acre tract of the land was placed into federal trust status in 2018, opening the way for development of the property as a tourist destination with gaming, restaurants and entertainment.

Marinas 
List of Marinas on Lake Eufaula.
 Area 51 Marina 
 Belle Starr Marina 
 Duchess Creek Marina 
 Eufaula Cove Marina 
 Evergreen Marina 
 Lake Eufaula Marina 
 No. 9 Marina

References

External links
U.S. Army Corps of Engineers: Eufaula Lake
Lake Eufaula information, photos and videos on TravelOK.com Official travel and tourism website for the State of Oklahoma
 Oklahoma Digital Maps: Digital Collections of Oklahoma and Indian Territory
 Lake Eufaula Online Guide

Eufaula
Protected areas of McIntosh County, Oklahoma
Protected areas of Pittsburg County, Oklahoma
Protected areas of Haskell County, Oklahoma
Bodies of water of McIntosh County, Oklahoma
Bodies of water of Pittsburg County, Oklahoma
Bodies of water of Haskell County, Oklahoma
1964 establishments in Oklahoma